The Fleet Model 60K Fort was the only aircraft designed and built by Canadians during the Second World War and was also the first all-metal monoplane built by Fleet Aircraft of Canada (Fort Erie). It was intended to be an intermediate trainer employed for pilot training between the de Havilland Tiger Moth primary trainer and the North American Harvard advanced trainer. Although it served with the British Commonwealth Air Training Plan, the Fort was redundant and was used to train wireless (radio) operators and had a relatively short operational career.

Design and development
The Fort was originally designed as an advanced flying trainer and in 1940 orders were placed for 200 to be built for the British Commonwealth Air Training Plan. The Fleet 60 was designed as a monoplane with a low elliptical wing and a raised rear cockpit. An unusual feature was the fixed undercarriage. Although fixed, the undercarriage was fitted with a retractable fairing. This feature was intended to familiarize student pilots with an undercarriage retraction mechanism but without causing external damage by a forgetful student.

Production was delayed, however, as the first Royal Canadian Air Force (RCAF) model was not flying until 18 April 1941. The availability of the Fairchild Cornell, and a change in what constituted an "advanced" trainer, led to the contract's being sharply cut back, and only 101 Forts were ultimately delivered to the RCAF between June 1941 and June 1942.

Operational history

Initially, the RCAF did not want to order the Model 60K, and their concerns proved valid. Pilot trainees found the Fort relatively easy to master, thereby making it unsuitable for transition to combat aircraft (e.g., Hawker Hurricane). Also, the RCAF decided that pilots who had soloed in Fleet Finches and de Havilland Tiger Moths could proceed to Harvards without training on Forts. The Forts were then used to train wireless operators at No. 2 Wireless School, Calgary and No. 3 Wireless School, Winnipeg.

Two models were built, one having a  Jacobs engine and the other having a  Jacobs.

The last Forts saw active service in 1944 and they were phased out of use by 1945; the last Model 60K was retired in 1946.

Variants
 Model 60 : Proposed advanced trainer version, powered by a Jacobs L-7 radial piston engine. Not built.
 Model 60K : Two-seat intermediate training aircraft for the RCAF. RCAF designation Fort Mk I.
 Fort Mk II : All 101 production aircraft were converted into wireless training aircraft for the RCAF
 Model 60L : Proposed version, powered by a Jacobs L-4MB radial piston engine. Not built.

Specifications

See also

References

Citations

Bibliography

 Holmes, Tony. Jane's Vintage Aircraft Recognition Guide. London: Harper Collins, 2005. .
 Molson, Ken M. and Taylor, Harold A. Canadian Aircraft Since 1909. Stittsville, Ontario: Canada's Wings, Inc., 1982. .
 Page, Ron D. and Cumming, William. Fleet: The Flying Years. Erin, Ontario: Boston Mills Press, 1990. .

Fort
Single-engined tractor aircraft
Low-wing aircraft
1940s Canadian military trainer aircraft
Aircraft first flown in 1940